Belgium competed at the 2022 World Aquatics Championships in Budapest, Hungary from 17 June to 3 July.

Open water swimming

Belgium qualified one male open water swimmer.

Swimming

Belgium entered 4 swimmers.

Men

Women

References

World Aquatics Championships
2022
Nations at the 2022 World Aquatics Championships